Robert Allan Pyne (October 29, 1853 – June 18, 1931) was an Ontario physician and political figure. He represented Toronto East and then Toronto Northeast in the Legislative Assembly of Ontario as a Conservative member from 1898 to 1918.

Background
He was born in Newmarket, Canada West, the son of Doctor Thomas Pyne. He studied at the University of Toronto and Queen's University. Pyne served as secretary and treasurer for the Ontario College of Physicians and Surgeons. He married Mary Isobel Macqueen. He practiced medicine in Toronto and also served on the Toronto school board and Board of Health. He served as assistant surgeon in the local militia.

Politics
Pyne was Minister of Education from 1905 to 1918. He resigned his seat in 1918 and was named clerk for York County. Pyne was also a governor of the University of Toronto. During the war he was put in charge of establishing the Ontario Military Hospital at Orpington, Kent, England, at which time he was made a lieutenant-colonel in the Canadian Army. During his lengthy absence G. Howard Ferguson served as Acting Minister of Education.

References

External links

1853 births
1931 deaths
Progressive Conservative Party of Ontario MPPs
University of Toronto alumni
Members of the Executive Council of Ontario